Zach Mathers (born April 14, 1994) is an American soccer player.

Career

College
Mathers spent his entire college career at Duke University.  He made a total of 71 appearances for the Blue Devils and tallied 14 goals and 18 assists.

Professional
On January 14, 2016, Mathers was selected in the second round (35th overall) of the 2016 MLS SuperDraft by Seattle Sounders FC.  However, he was cut during preseason and on March 9, he signed a professional contract with USL affiliate club Seattle Sounders FC 2.  He made his professional debut on March 25 in a 1–0 defeat against Sacramento Republic.  He played his first game for Seattle Sounders FC in the US Open Cup in a 2-0 win against the Kitsap Pumas on June 15, 2016.
On March 2, 2018 Mathers was waived by Seattle Sounders FC.

References

External links
Duke Blue Devils bio

1994 births
Living people
American soccer players
Association football midfielders
Duke Blue Devils men's soccer players
Las Vegas Lights FC players
People from Keller, Texas
Seattle Sounders FC draft picks
Seattle Sounders FC players
Tacoma Defiance players
Soccer players from Texas
USL Championship players
USL League Two players